The 2005–06 Czech Extraliga season was the 13th season of the Czech Extraliga since its creation after the breakup of Czechoslovakia and the Czechoslovak First Ice Hockey League in 1993.

Regular season

Standings 

Key
(C) = Playoff champions; (Q) = Qualified to playoffs; (RP) = Relegation playoff; (O) = Relegation playoff winner; (R) = Relegated.

Playoffs

Bracket 
Quarterfinals
HC Slavia Prague beats HC Ocelari Trinec 4 games to 0
HC Ceske Budejovice beats HC Bili Tygri Liberec 4 games to 1
HC Sparta Prague beats HC Hame Zlin 4 games to 2
HC Znojemsti Orli beats HC Vitkovice Steel 4 games to 2
Semifinals
HC Slavia Prague beats HC Ceske Budejovice 4 games to 1
HC Sparta Prague beats HC Znojemsti Orli 4 games to 1
Final
HC Sparta Prague beats HC Slavia Prague 4 games to 2

Relegation

Play-out round
Vsetinska hokejova - HC Slovan Ustecti Lvi 0-2, 4-1, 1-3, 3-2, 2-1, 1-0

HC Vsetin is relegated

References

External links 

 

2005-06
Czech
1